Risto Milosavov (born 9 March 1965) is a retired Macedonian football defender.

International career
He made his senior debut for Macedonia in a March 1996 friendly match against Malta in Prilep and has earned a total of 8 caps. His final international was a September 1997 FIFA World Cup qualification match against Lithuania.

References

External sources

 CSKA SOFIA 1995/96
 CSKA SOFIA 1996/97
 CSKA SOFIA 1997/98

1965 births
Living people
Sportspeople from Štip
Association football defenders
Yugoslav footballers
Macedonian footballers
North Macedonia international footballers
FK Bregalnica Štip players
FK Osogovo players
PFC Dobrudzha Dobrich players
PFC CSKA Sofia players
Apollon Pontou FC players
FK Sasa players
FK Kumanovo players
Macedonian First Football League players
First Professional Football League (Bulgaria) players
Football League (Greece) players
Macedonian Second Football League players
Macedonian expatriate footballers
Expatriate footballers in Bulgaria
Macedonian expatriate sportspeople in Bulgaria
Expatriate footballers in Greece
Macedonian expatriate sportspeople in Greece